John Barron (1934–2008) was an Irish sportsman.  He played hurling with his local club De La Salle and with the Waterford senior inter-county team from 1954 until 1964.

Playing career

Club

Barron played his club hurling with his local De La Salle club.  He never won a senior county title.

Inter-county

Barron first came to prominence on the inter-county scene in the late 1950s as a member of the Waterford senior hurling team.  At this time, however, Tipperary and Cork were the kingpins of Munster hurling, with all the other counties only providing a supporting role.  All this changed in 1957 when Barron won his first Munster title following a victory over reigning champions Cork.  Waterford later played Kilkenny in the All-Ireland final, however, victory went to the men from Leinster on that occasion.  Waterford were leading by six points with fifteen minutes left, however, the game ended 4–10 to 3–12.  Two years later in 1959 Barron won a second provincial title.  Once again Waterford lined out in the championship decider and once again Kilkenny provided the opposition.  The game ended in a draw, however, when the two sides met for the replay the men from Waterford made no mistake in defeating their near rivals and Barron collected an All-Ireland medal.  In 1963 he added a National Hurling League medal to his collection before winning a third Munster title.  For the third successive time Kilkenny were Waterford's opponents in the All-Ireland final, however, the men from the Déise came back from an 11-point deficit but were still beaten by 'the Cats'.  Barron retired from inter-county hurling in 1964.

Inter-provincial

Barron also lined out with Munster in the inter-provincial hurling competition.  He captured four successive Railway Cup medals in 1958, 1959, 1960 and 1961.

Post-playing career

John Barron died on 28 April 2008 aged 74.

Teams

References
 John Barron's obituary on Hoganstand.com
 Munster final winning teams
 Waterford GAA honours 

1934 births
2008 deaths
Dual players
De La Salle hurlers
De La Salle Gaelic footballers
Waterford inter-county hurlers
Munster inter-provincial hurlers
Hurling goalkeepers
All-Ireland Senior Hurling Championship winners